The Edgar Allan Poe Award for Best Paperback or eBook Original was established in 1970. 

The award honors the best mystery book that is initially printed as a paperback or eBook without a hardcover edition. EBooks must be published by a reputable publisher, as determined by the Mystery Writers of America. American authors' debut novels are not eligible for the award, though they are eligible for the Edgar Allan Poe Award for Best First Novel. 

The Edgar Allan Poe Award for Best Paperback Original winners are listed below.

Winners

1970-1999

2000s

2010s

2020s

See also 
 Edgar Award
 Mystery Writers of America
 :Category:Edgar Award winners
 :Category:Edgar Award winning works

References

Lists of writers by award
Mystery and detective fiction awards
English-language literary awards